Humera Airport  is an airport serving Humera, a town in the northwestern Tigray Region of Ethiopia. The name of the city and airport may also be transliterated as Himera or Himora.

Humera's current airport opened in July 2009. It was constructed by the Ethiopian Airports Enterprise over a three-year period, at a cost of over 182 million birr (about 16 million U.S. dollars based in July 2009 exchange rates).

Tigray War
On 10 November 2020 during the Tigray War, the Ethiopian National Defense Force (ENDF) took over control of the airport from Tigray People's Liberation Front (TPLF) forces. As of 23 November 2020, Humera town itself was run by Amhara Region administrative and military forces.

Facilities 
Humera Airport has one runway, which measures .

Airlines and destinations

References 

Airports in Ethiopia
Tigray Region